USS APc-15 was a United States Navy  vessel in World War II. Laid down on 29 April 1942 as Coastal Minesweeper AMc-155 at Camden Ship Building and Marineway, Camden, Maine, she was launched on 9 July 1942 and commissioned as APc-25 on 27 October 1942.

She served with the Seventh Fleet Amphibious Force in the South West Pacific Area conducting operations off the coast of New Guinea. She took part in the Bismarck Archipelago Operations around Arawe, New Britain between 17-18 and 25-26 December 1943.

Fate
She sank in 1998 at Deas Slough near Vancouver, British Columbia, Canada.

References

1942 ships
Ships built in Camden, Maine
APc-1-class small coastal transports
Shipwrecks of the British Columbia coast